Svay Leu District is a district of Siem Reap Province, in north western Cambodia. According to the 1998 census of Cambodia, it had a population of 12,869.

Administrative divisions 
Svay Leu DistrictIs a district in Siem Reap Province. The district has 5 communes and 28 villages.

References 

Districts of Cambodia
Geography of Siem Reap province